Ross Intermediate is a state co-educational intermediate school located in the Palmerston North, New Zealand suburb of Roslyn. It is the first school in New Zealand to have its own television station and laptop programme. The school television station has since been discontinued.

Opening in 1958, Ross Intermediate has a school roll of  students as of  Students are placed into a composite class on the first day of Year 7. Students usually stay with the same teacher for their two years attending the school. As of 2015, class sizes are no more than 24 students. However, the school tries to keep numbers at 23 students per class.

History 

Ross Intermediate School was officially opened by the Minister of Education and local MP Philip Skoglund, on 14 February 1958.

School houses 

In 2006, under the guidance of principal Wayne Jenkins, the school houses were established as a way of creating competition among the school. These are useful for organising competitive teams in sports and cultural events. On creation, the houses were Ngata, Hillary, Cooper and Batten. In 2014, a new house was added, named Cooper; this house contained the school's media classes. In 2015, Batten was removed, resulting in the current house system. The current house names, with the exception of Cooper, are the same house names used for Awatapu College, also in Palmerston North.

References

External links

Intermediate schools in New Zealand
Schools in Palmerston North
1958 establishments in New Zealand
Educational institutions established in 1958